The 2021 National Women's Soccer League season was the ninth season of the National Women's Soccer League, the top division of women's soccer in the United States. Including the NWSL's two professional predecessors, Women's Professional Soccer (2009–2011) and the Women's United Soccer Association (2001–2003), it is the 15th overall season of FIFA and USSF-sanctioned top division women's soccer in the United States.

This season was the first in which the NWSL has been fully self-governing. After the 2020 season, the league terminated its management contract with the United States Soccer Federation (USSF or U.S. Soccer), which nonetheless continues to provide major financial support to the NWSL. Further financial backing is provided by the Canadian Soccer Association. Both national federations pay the league salaries of many of their respective national team members in an effort to nurture talent in those nations and take a major financial burden off of individual clubs.

On November 18, 2020, the NWSL announced new competition formats for the 2021 season. The Challenge Cup became a league cup competition played before the start of the regular season. The Cup was followed by the 24-match regular season, which began on May 15 and concluded on October 31. The playoffs were expanded to include the six teams, with the top two seeds receiving a first-round bye. Playoffs started on November 6 and concluded with the NWSL Championship on November 20.

In the 2021 NWSL Challenge Cup, Portland Thorns FC and NJ/NY Gotham FC won the West and East Divisions, respectively, earning the right to play in the final. As Portland had the better record, they hosted the final, which was played on May 8 in Providence Park in Portland, Oregon. The game was a 1–1 draw after 90 minutes; Portland won the ensuing penalty shootout 6–5 to win the cup.

In the regular season, the Portland Thorns won the most points and thus earned the NWSL Shield.

In the playoffs, the Washington Spirit and Chicago Red Stars progressed to the final, which was played on Nov. 20, 2021 in Louisville, Kentucky. The Spirit prevailed 2–1 in overtime, winning the NWSL Championship.

The season was also marked by a sexual misconduct controversy that erupted on September 30, when The Athletic published an investigation into North Carolina Courage head coach Paul Riley that accused him of a pattern of sexual coercion and abuse, and also alleged numerous inappropriate comments about players' physical appearance and sexuality. More than a dozen players from every team Riley had coached since 2010 spoke to the publication, and two named players went on the record with allegations against him. The Courage fired Riley that day, and U.S. Soccer immediately suspended his coaching license. The next day, the NWSL called off all of its scheduled matches for that weekend, both FIFA and U.S. Soccer announced they were starting their own investigations into Riley, league commissioner Lisa Baird resigned, and league general counsel Lisa Levine was dismissed. Further reporting revealed systemic failure by NWSL leadership to investigate allegations against Riley, including some made in the 2021 season.

Teams, stadiums, and personnel

Team names 
Before the start of the season, Sky Blue FC rebranded as NJ/NY Gotham FC with new team insignia, jerseys, and colors.

The new Kansas City team, which played the 2021 season under the placeholder name of Kansas City NWSL, announced its permanent identity of Kansas City Current at its final home game on October 30.

Stadiums and locations 

Capacities listed here are full capacities, and do not reflect COVID-19 restrictions.

Personnel and sponsorship 

Note: All teams use Nike as their kit manufacturer.

Coaching changes

Regular season

Tiebreakers 
The initial determining factor for a team's position in the standings (and hence playoff qualification and seeding) is points earned, with three points earned for a win, one point for a draw, and zero points for a loss. If two or more teams are tied in points, the NWSL uses the following tiebreaker criteria in the order listed:

 Head-to-head win–loss record, or points per game if more than two teams, between the teams tied in points.
 Greatest goal difference (against all teams, not just tied teams).
 Greatest total number of goals scored (against all teams, not just tied teams).
 Apply #1–3 to games played on the road.
 Apply #1–3 to games played at home.
Coin toss or drawing of lots.

Note: If two clubs remain tied after another club with the same number of points advances during any step, tiebreaker determination restarts at step 1.

Attendance 
NWSL attendance in 2021 was impacted by the ongoing COVID-19 pandemic. Many early-season matches were closed to the public because of COVID restrictions, and when games were opened, many teams had lower average attendances than the most recent regular season in 2019.

Average home attendances 
Ranked from highest to lowest average attendance.

Updated through 2021 season. A total of 2 matches were not reported, mostly resulting from the absence of fans due to COVID-19 pandemic restrictions. Portland Thorns FC were the only club to not report matches (versus Louisville June 5 and Kansas City June 20). Two matches (September 4 Washington at Portland and September 12 OL Reign at Washington) were declared forfeits by Washington due to COVID protocol violations and not played.

Statistical leaders

Top scorers

Top assists

Clean sheets

Hat-tricks

Playoffs 

Beginning this season, the top six teams from the regular season competed for the NWSL Championship, with the top two teams receiving a first-round bye.

First round

Semi-finals

Championship  

Championship MVP: Aubrey Bledsoe (WAS)

Challenge Cup 
The 2021 NWSL Challenge Cup was a tournament-style competition starting on April 9 and ending with a final played on May 8, before the start of the regular NWSL season. The tournament was organized as a group stage with two five-team, geographically chosen groups playing a round-robin, followed by a single-game final featuring the top team from each group. NJ/NY Gotham FC won the Eastern Division and the Portland Thorns won the Western one. In the final, held at Providence Park in Portland, these two teams tied 1-1 after 90 minutes and went straight to a penalty-kick shootout, with Portland prevailing 6–5 in seven rounds of penalties.

East Division

West Division

Championship

Individual awards

Annual awards

Monthly Awards

Player of the Month

Team of the Month

Weekly awards

References

External links 

 
2021
National Women's Soccer League
National Women's Soccer League season